The Military Ordinariate of Slovakia is a Latin military ordinariate (pseudo-diocese) of the Roman Catholic Church for the Slovak armed forces.

It is exempt, i.e. immediately subject to the Holy See (not part of any ecclesiastical province and its Roman Congregation for Bishops.
 
The Cathedral episcopal see is Katedrála sv. Šebastiána, dedicated to Saint Sebastian, in the Slovak national capital Bratislava, which in 2009 replaced the Cathedral of St. John of Matha and St. Felix of Valois (Katedrála sv. Jána a sv. Felixa z Valois), also in Bratislava.

History 
The military ordinariate, without precursor, was established by Pope John Paul II on 20 January 2003, ten years after the country's independence by the dissolution of Czechoslovakia.

Statistics 
As per 2014, it provides pastoral care to Roman Catholics serving in the Slovak Armed Forces and their families in 56 parishes with 54 priests (46 diocesan, 8 religious), 1 deacon and 8 lay religious brothers.

Military ordinaries 
 František Rábek (incumbent, 20 January 2003 – ...), previously Auxiliary Bishop of Nitra (Slovakia) (1991.07.13 – 2003.01.20) and Titular Bishop of Catrum (1991.07.13 – 2003.01.20)

See also

 List of Roman Catholic dioceses in Slovakia

References

Sources and external links 
 Military Ordinariate of Slovakia (Catholic-Hierarchy)
 GCatholic.org, with Google map and satellite photo
 picasaweb.google.com St.Sebastian cathedral

Slovakia
Slovakia
Christian organizations established in 2003
2003 establishments in Slovakia